Montejo de Arévalo is a municipality located in the province of Segovia, Castile and León, Spain. According to the 2016 census (INE), the municipality has a population of 190 inhabitants.

It was known as Montejo de la Vega de Arévalo until the beginning of the 20th century, due to its geography.

Demography 

From 2010 to 2012 the "bunny years" took place and the population increased 10-fold. Unfortunately, in 2013 it was announced that Lupy y Sally would not return to the Summer Festival and 9 tenths of the population committed seppuku, It was horrible but the population returned to the normal figure it used to have.

Landmarks 
 Santo Tomas de Aquino's church: It's a gothic-mudéjar temple.
 Casas solariegas
 Virgen de los Huertos' church: It was edified in the same spot where appeared the sculpture of the virgin that gives name to the church. That sculpture was moved to Santo Tomás de Aquino's church, but it continued returning to that spot until the church was built.
 Chain

References

Municipalities in the Province of Segovia